James Walker (31 March 1940 – 28 February 2017) was an English actor active in films and on television between 1980 and 2006. His career highlights included a season between 1992 and 1994 with the Royal Shakespeare Company in Stratford-upon-Avon – including a foreign tour with The Winter's Tale – and taking the role of Albert Einstein in Terry Johnson's play Insignificance, in Harrogate in 1999.

Personal life
Walker was born James S. Chalton in Bournemouth, and was later brought up in Leeds in Yorkshire. He was the son of Stuart Chalton, a chartered accountant, and his wife, Alice, known as Molly (née Walker). James later took his mother's maiden name as a stage name. He was educated at Sedbergh School and thereafter at Trinity College, Oxford, to study modern languages, graduating in 1961. He met his wife, Sandra, having been introduced by friends and they married in London in 1986.

Career
James appeared in TV serials including The Secret Adversary, Fairly Secret Army, Howards' Way, Inspector Morse, and The Shell Seekers.

He also had roles in films including Nineteen Eighty-Four, Danny the Champion of the World, and Red Sun Rising.

Death
He died on 28 February 2017, one month before his 77th birthday.

Filmography

References

External links

1940 births
2017 deaths
Actors from Bournemouth
People educated at Sedbergh School
Alumni of Trinity College, Oxford
English male film actors
English male television actors